The Highways (Obstruction by Body Corporate) Act 2004 (c 29) is an Act of the Parliament of the United Kingdom.

Parliamentary debates

The Bill for this Act passed through its stages in the House of Commons on the following dates:

The Bill for this Act passed through its stages in the House of Lords on the following dates:

Section 1 - Liability of officers etc. for obstruction by body corporate
Section 1(1) inserts references to sections 137 and 137ZA of Highways Act 1980 into section 314(3) of that Act.

Section 1(2) provides that section 314 of that Act applies by virtue of this section to any offence under section 137ZA(3) committed after the commencement of this Act, including one committed in respect of an order made before that commencement.

Section 2 - Commencement and short title
Section 2(1) provides that the Act came into force at the end of the period of two months that began on the date on which it was passed. The word "months" means calendar months. The day (that is to say, 15 November 2004) on which the Act was passed (that is to say, received royal assent) is included in the period of two months. This means that the Act came into force on 15 January 2005.

See also
Highway Act

References
Halsbury's Statutes,

External links
The Highways (Obstruction by Body Corporate) Act 2004, as amended from the National Archives.
The Highways (Obstruction by Body Corporate) Act 2004, as originally enacted from the National Archives.
Explanatory notes to the Highways (Obstruction by Body Corporate) Act 2004.

United Kingdom Acts of Parliament 2004